The Earth Day 20 International Peace Climb was an expedition to reach the summit of Mount Everest during Earth Week 1990 led by Jim Whittaker, the first American to climb Mount Everest (in 1963),  envisioned by Warren Thompson, and marked the first time in history that mountaineers from the United States, Soviet Union and China had roped together to climb a mountain, let alone Mount Everest.

The expedition's name was from its partnership with the Earth Day 20 Foundation, an organization celebrating the 20th anniversary of Earth Day that was led by Edward Furia.  The climbers highlighted their expedition with a live satellite phone call to President George H. W. Bush as well as to Furia, Earth Day 20 organizers and thousands of supporters gathered in George, Washington, near the Columbia River on April 22, 1990. Whittaker called from base camp to pledge his support for world peace and attention to environmental issues.

The group also collected over two tons of trash (transported down the mountain by support groups along the way) that was left behind on Mount Everest from previous climbing expeditions.

Summiters
Summiters in May 1990, as led by Jim Whittaker
Robert Link
Steve Gall
Sergei Arsentiev 
Grigori Lunyakov
Da Cheme 
Gyal Bu
Ed Viesturs
Mistislav Gorbenko
Andrej Tselishchev 
Ian Wade
Da Qiong
Luo Tse
Ren Na
Gui Sang 
Yekaterina Ivanova
Anatoli Moshnikov 
Yervand Ilyinski
Aleksandr Tokarev
Mark Tucker
Wang Ja
Warren Thompson

See also
List of Mount Everest expeditions
List of 20th-century summiters of Mount Everest
Earth Day

References

External links
NY Times article about this expedition from 1990

1990